James Henry Caldwell was a Scottish professional footballer who played as a goalkeeper in the Scottish League for East Stirlingshire and Alloa Athletic. He also played Football League for Everton and Woolwich Arsenal.

Personal life 
Caldwell served as a private in the Black Watch during the First World War.

Career statistics

Honours 
Dunipace

 Scottish Junior Cup: 1905–06

Alloa Athletic

 Scottish Second Division: 1921–22

References 

Scottish footballers
Reading F.C. players
English Football League players
Footballers from Falkirk (council area)
Association football goalkeepers
Southern Football League players
Dunipace F.C. players
East Stirlingshire F.C. players
Scottish Football League players
Tottenham Hotspur F.C. players
Arsenal F.C. players
Alloa Athletic F.C. players
British Army personnel of World War I
Black Watch soldiers

1884 births

Year of death missing